Patrícia Renaux Chamagne de Sabrit (born April 27, 1975), best known as Patrícia de Sabrit, is a Brazilian actress and television presenter.

Personal life
Sabrit was born and raised in Brusque, in the state of Santa Catarina, daughter of Marina and Thiery de Sabrit. She is of French and German descent. Patrícia is the cousin of label consultant Fabio Arruda. In 1997, in parallel to her acting career, she began studying cinema at the Pontifical Catholic University of São Paulo (PUC), where she graduated in 2000.

In 2000 she began dating Brazilian singer Fábio Júnior, marrying him in 2001. On June 12, however, the two announced their separation after only six months of marriage.

At the end of 2001, Patricia traveled to Europe and met Belgian businessman Michael Hansen, with whom she started dating.  The two remained in a distance relationship for two years. In 2003, he moved to Brazil. In the same year, Patrícia abdicated her career to fit the universe of her boyfriend, becoming a more present figure in the high society of the city of São Paulo and in philanthropic events, accompanying him also in business trips.

On May 8, 2007 the only son of the couple, Maximilian de Sabrit Hansen, was born at the Albert Einstein Hospital in São Paulo, Brazil. In 2009 Patricia moved to Belgium with her husband and in 2013, after twelve years together, the relationship ended. In the same year, still living in Europe, Patricia began dating Olivier Murguet, a Frenchman who is the president of the multinational Renault. In 2014 the couple moved to the United States.

Filmography

Television

Stage

References

External links
 

1975 births
Living people
Brazilian emigrants to the United States
People from Brusque, Santa Catarina
Brazilian people of French descent
Brazilian people of German descent
Brazilian television actresses
Brazilian stage actresses
Brazilian television presenters
Brazilian expatriates in Belgium
Brazilian women television presenters